Catocala andromache, the Andromache underwing, is a moth of the family Erebidae. The species was first described by Henry Edwards in 1885. It is found in the United States from southern California to Arizona.

Subspecies Catocala andromache benjamini has been elevated to species level and is now known as Catocala benjamini.

The wingspan is 50 to 55 mm. Adults are on wing from June to July depending on the location. There is probably one generation per year.

The larvae feed on Quercus dumosa, Quercus turbinella and Quercus wislizeni.

Subspecies
Catocala andromache wellsi, recorded from Central California, is now considered a synonym.

References

External links
Species info

andromache
Fauna of the California chaparral and woodlands
Moths described in 1885
Moths of North America